István Hetényi (3 August 1926 – 11 November 2008) was a Hungarian politician, who served as Minister of Finance between 1980 and 1986.

References
 László Csaba: Búcsú az örökös pénzügyminisztertől, Élet és Irodalom, 2008. november 21.
 Lengyel László: a Nagy Öreg halála
 Békesi László: Elment az örökös pénzügyminiszter

1926 births
2008 deaths
Politicians from Budapest
Members of the Hungarian Socialist Workers' Party
Members of the Hungarian Working People's Party
Finance ministers of Hungary